The 2008–09 season was Burnley's 9th season in the second tier of English football. They were managed by Owen Coyle – his second season since he replaced Steve Cotterill on 8 November 2007. Burnley finished fifth in the league but were promoted to the Premier League after winning the Football League Championship playoffs. It was the first time the club was in the top division of English Football for 33 years.

First-team squad 
Updated 30 June 2008.

Current squad

Transfers

In

Out

Match details

Football League Championship

League table

Matches

Football League Championship play-offs

FA Cup

Football League Cup

Appearances and goals
Numbers in parentheses denote appearances as substitute.
Players with names struck through and marked  left the club during the playing season.
Players with names in italics and marked * were on loan from another club with Burnley.
Key to positions: GK – Goalkeeper; DF – Defender; MF – Midfielder; FW – Forward

Player of the Year Awards 2009

References

2008-09
2008–09 Football League Championship by team